Batfink is an American animated television series, consisting of five-minute shorts, that first aired in April 1966. The 100-episode series was quickly created by Hal Seeger, starting in 1966, to send up the popular Batman and Green Hornet television series, which had premiered the same year.

Plot
Batfink is a bat superhero with metal wings. With the help of his aide, Karate, he fights crime in his city, usually against his recurring villain, Hugo A-Go-Go.

Cliffhangers
Many episodes end with Batfink in a dangerous situation; typically, this is effected by trapping him in some sort of bondage, placing him in a position that renders his wings useless. At the moment the potentially fatal shot is fired, the action freezes, and the narrator asks dramatically if Batfink will survive. The action then continues, with Batfink escaping, via a convenient, but previously unseen deus ex machina, or through the use of his superpowers.

Characters

Batfink
Sir Batfink (voiced by Frank Buxton) is a superpowered anthropomorphic grey cyborg bat in a yellow costume with a big red "B" on the chest and red gauntlets and boots. He uses his supersonic sonar radar and black metallic wings to fight crime. When not fighting crime, Batfink lives in a split-level cave, though he also has a direct video link to the Chief's office in case his help is needed.

Batfink's "supersonic sonar radar" is a super-powered version of a bat's echolocation, used to locate prey. Batfink's power takes the form of the letters of the word "BEEP", either once or twice emanating from his mouth. The letters are anthropomorphic and sentient and can fly wherever Batfink needs them to go – accompanied by a distinctive beeping noise. His catchphrase during that time is "My supersonic sonar radar will help me!" Whenever Batfink said those words, he would say it through the open sun roof of the Battilac car, while it was not in motion. The letters can see; feel fear; evade capture; and report back to Batfink on what they have seen. In one episode, the "BEEP" is ambushed and beaten up. The "BEEP" also gets confused, misdirected, and lost, leaving Batfink to rely on other means to spy upon the episode's villain. Once, when the "BEEP" is sent to investigate Queenie Bee and her swarm of villainous bees, it returns with the letters "EEP" swollen with bee stings. When Karate asks Batfink: "How come they just stung the EEP?" Batfink replies: "Because a bee would never harm another 'B.' But a 'B' will tell on another bee – Queenie Bee is in THERE!" The literal spelled-out appearance of an onomatopœia was a running gag not limited to the supersonic sonar radar; in one episode, Hugo A-Go-Go invented a tickling stick that tickles its adversaries into submission, which sent out the words "Kitchy Koo" to do the deed on Batfink (the episode ended with Batfink slicing the K's off to create the far more irritating, but less distracting, "Itchy Oo").

Batfink's main defense are his metallic wings, which he is able to fold around himself as a protective shield against most attacks, thereby spawning the most famous catchphrase of the show: "Your bullets cannot harm me – my wings are like a shield of steel!" He claims in some episodes that his wings are stainless steel, but in other episodes he explicitly states that they are not – since he always carries a can of spot remover to keep them polished. Batfink can also use his wings as offensive weapons. In one episode, he uses one of them as a sword during a duel. His wings can also help him fly at incredible speeds. They are often used to help him escape certain death or cut through bonds when he has been captured (he can break out of regular ropes, but not rubber ones). In the episode "Ebenezer the Freezer", Batfink has automatic retrorockets built into his wings, but not in any other episode. Sometimes, his wings hinder him. When in water, he will sink because of the weight of his metal wings. Powerful magnets are also a problem for him. Plutonium, for reasons unexplained (but possibly relating to his birth in a plutonium mine), also renders the wings useless. Batfink's life and wings are explained in the final episode, "Batfink: This Is Your Life", which depicts his boyhood and how his real wings were replaced.

Batfink rides in a customized pink car resembling a Volkswagen Beetle with scalloped rear fins and bat-winged red "B" emblems on the doors and hood. Called the "Battillac" (rhymes with "Cadillac"), the car is outfitted with a sun roof and many defensive devices, and is resistant to collision damage and energy weapons. Batfink often says something like "It's a good thing the Battillac is equipped with a thermonuclear plutonium-insulated blast shield!" and Karate replies, "It's also good it was a small bomb". As soon as a crime is acknowledged, Batfink says "Karate, the Battillac!" 

In the last episode of the series, titled "Batfink: This Is Your Life", it is revealed that Batfink was born in an abandoned plutonium mine, which is where he obtained his powers, and that he lost his natural wings as a child while saving his mother's life, after escaped convicts blew up their mountain-top cave (plutonium in real life is too scarce in the Earth's crust to be mined, it must be synthesized, usually from uranium). This incident is what motivated him to become a crime-fighter.

Karate
Kara "Karate" Te (voiced by Len Maxwell) is a gi-clad martial arts expert and Batfink's oafish sidekick who drives the Battillac. He is somewhat oversized and not very bright, but is strong enough to help Batfink out of any situation. He carries a wide variety of objects and gadgets in his "utility sleeve" (a parody of Batman's utility belt), but he often has trouble finding what he needs in it. Karate tends to succeed by dumb luck rather than by skill or ingenuity, and often Karate's involvement will make a bad situation worse. Karate is usually ordered to check downstairs while Batfink checks the upper floor. At the end of each episode, Karate will make a corny pun that is sometimes physical on the part of his stupidity. Karate's father was the blacksmith who made Batfink's metallic wings.

Karate is a direct send-up of Kato, the Green Hornet's companion, but his hulking size is inspired by the Bond villain Oddjob. Also, like in The Green Hornet, when both characters are in the car, Karate is the driver, while Batfink rides in the back seat. In early episodes, he speaks in a stereotypical Asian accent; in later episodes, he is voiced in a clipped, nasal speech pattern, inspired by Don Adams, whose Get Smart character, Maxwell Smart, was popular at the time. On occasion, Karate even utters the Maxwell Smart-inspired catchphrase, "Sorry about that, Batfink".

The Chief
The Chief (voiced by Len Maxwell) is Batfink's contact on the local police force and informs Batfink of all the latest crimes via a direct video link to Batfink's Split-Level Cave; Batfink answers "The hotline — Batfink here".

The Mayor
The Mayor is the unnamed mayor of the city that Batfink protects.

The Narrator
The Narrator (voiced by Len Maxwell) narrates each episode while explaining certain information and doing the cliffhanger narration.

Hugo A-Go-Go
The blue-smocked, wild-haired Hugo A-Go-Go (voiced by Frank Buxton) is the main villain of the series. He speaks English with a German accent. He is referred to as "the world's maddest mad scientist" and spends his time in his "secret" laboratory, creating weird and wacky inventions (including a robot bride, complete with robot mother-in-law) to defeat Batfink and dominate the world. He always manages to escape jail to antagonize the hero in a later episode. Hugo A-Go-Go often breaks the fourth wall and has conversations with the narrator.

Other villains
Other villains that are Batfink's enemies are:
 Ebeneezer the Freezer - a villain who collaborated with Hugo A-Go-Go in a plot to freeze the city.
 Mr. Boomer - the owner of Boomer Glass Works who has been using the sonic booms caused by his jets to improve his business.
 Big Ears Ernie - a villain with sensitive hearing.
 Manhole Manny - a villain who operates in the sewers.
 Mr. M. Flick - a mad movie maker.
 Skinny Minnie - the world's thinnest thief.
 Fatman - a criminal with an inflatable suit who steals fat items.
 Gluey Louie - a villain who uses glue in his capers.
 Brother Goose - a supervillain who always leaves taunting clues based on nursery rhymes.
 Myron the Magician - a criminal magician.
 Sporty Morty - a sports-themed villain that wields different sports equipment.
 The Ringading Brothers - Criminal acrobats.
 Stupidman - a criminal who commits crimes that no sensible person would commit. He is also the brother-in-law of the Chief.
 Professor Vibrato - a mad scientist that uses vibration technology.
 Greasy Gus - a villain who uses grease in his crimes.
 Zero - Plus A. Minus is a villain.
 Swami Salami - a criminal snake charmer.
 The Human Pretzel - a criminal contortionist.
 Professor Hopper - a criminal flea circus owner who uses his trained fleas to commit crimes.
 Roz the Schnozz - a criminal with a bloodhound-like nose.
 Lucky Chuck - a lucky criminal.
 Party Marty - a party-themed criminal who uses special party favors in his crimes.
 Professor Flippo - a mad scientist who invented a machine that turns things upside down.
 The Rotten Rainmaker - a villain with a weather-controlling machine.
 Gypsy James - a parking-meter thief and fortune teller who makes voodoo dolls of Batfink and Karate to try to seal their fate.
 The Chameleon - an art thief who uses portable camouflage screens.
 Beanstalk Jack - a farmer who uses instant beanstalks in his crimes.
 Curly the Human Cannonball - a criminal human cannonball.
 Robber Hood - an archery-themed criminal.
 Sandman Sam - a criminal who uses "slumber sand" that puts anyone to sleep.
 The Great Escapo - an escape artist.
 Daniel Boom - a criminal who uses explosives in his crimes.
 Queenie Bee - a female supervillain with her army of bees. Batfink sends Queenie Bee to Sing Sing and her bees to "Sting Sting".
 Sabubu - a thief from Baghdad.
 The Mean Green Midget - a short criminal who grows fruits and vegetables to help in his crimes.
 Napoleon Blownapart - a criminal who uses hand grenades to blow up stuff.
 Magneto the Magnificent - a criminal who wields magnetic gauntlets.
 Buster the Ruster - a criminal who uses a spray gun that shoots "rust dust".
 Mike the Mimic - an impersonator.
 Cinderobber - a criminal cleaning lady.
 Mr. Bouncy - a former bouncer who uses a special spray to turn anything into rubber.
 Old King Cruel - 
 Victor the Predictor - a criminal who uses a prediction motif.
 Goldyunlocks - a female villain with an obsession of unlocking every lock she sees. Batfink finally defeats her by putting her in a cell with no lock.
 The Three Baer Brothers - the henchmen of Goldyunlocks.
 Bowl Brummel - a criminal bowler.
 Harold Hamboné - an opera understudy.
 Mr. Blankenstein - a green-skinned criminal whose gun shoots out "blanks" that give people amnesia.
 Whip Van Winkle - a criminal who uses whips in his crimes.
 Tough MacDuff - Batfink's oldest enemy. After being released from prison, he gathered Hugo A-Go-Go and other villains in a plot to get Batfink to leave town.
 Judy Jitsu - a martial artist, whose name is derived from jujutsu, and on whom Karate has a crush.
 Father Time Bomb - a criminal who uses time bombs in his crimes.

Episodes

Hidden political message
According to Dave Mackey's Batfink site, a two-part political message is concealed in two episodes, disguised as sped-up gibberish. Mackey translates the message as follows:

 Part 1 (in "Spin the Batfink"): "The most dangerous force in America today is Walter Reuther and his political machine. It’s time we realized that they intend to run this country. When the smut publishers put a..."
 Part 2 (in "Bride and Doom"): "...dirty cover on a clean book, let’s take it at face value and call it trash and dump it in the river".

Production and syndication
The cartoon was produced at Hal Seeger Studios, in New York City, and at Bill Ackerman Productions in Midland Park, New Jersey. It was syndicated by Screen Gems and continued to air on local stations throughout the 1980s. Nickelodeon briefly aired episodes of Batfink on Weinerville as well as its Nick in the Afternoon block in 1995 and 1997. In September 2006, it returned to the U.S. as part of "Cartoons Without a Clue", Boomerang's mystery lineup on weekends.

The Batfink series was very popular in the UK, becoming a cult series like the later Danger Mouse, and from 1967 onwards, it was shown at least once every year on UK terrestrial television until 1983, initially on the BBC network, where it was allocated an early evening slot just before the BBC News, and latterly as part of Children's ITV; it subsequently reappeared in 1986 on the ITV Saturday morning magazine show Get Fresh. In the early 1990s, it was repeated again as part of TV-am's Wide Awake Club/Wacaday series; after Wacaday finished in 1992, Batfink was consigned to the vaults in the UK for the next twelve years. It was introduced to a new audience in 2004, when it was included in a number of episodes of the BBC's Saturday morning show Dick and Dom in da Bungalow, and since April 2006, it has been enjoying an extended, if somewhat irregular, repeat run on CBBC.

Batfink was made quickly and cheaply by re-using stock sequences. Although most serial animations do this to some extent, Batfink did it more than most. Commonly repeated scenes include the intro to the initial briefings by the Chief (the TV screen hotline buzzing into life), Batfink and Karate getting into the Battillac, the Battillac going round mountain bends, the Battillac going over a bridge, Batfink's supersonic sonar radar, and others. Sometimes, the repeated scenes would be cut short, so that sections could be re-used to fit the storyline more closely.

DVD release
 Cinema Club released the complete series on Region 2 DVD on 6 December 2004.
 Shout! Factory released Batfink: The Complete Series on DVD in Region 1 on 3 July 2007.
 Both DVD boxsets run over four DVDs and contain all 100 episodes of the series.
 In January 2007, A-Design released a single Batfink DVD in Bulgaria, which includes 26 5-minute segments.

See also
 List of local children's television series (United States)

References

External links
  (with links to each Batfink episode)
 
 Batfink at Don Markstein's Toonopedia Archived from the original on 27 August 2015.

1960s American animated television series
1966 American television series debuts
1967 American television series endings
American superhero comedy television series
Parody superheroes
Parodies of Batman
Batman in other media
Animated characters
American children's animated superhero television series
Fictional bats
Animated television series about mammals
American children's animated comedy television series
Television series by Screen Gems
Parodies of television shows
First-run syndicated television programs in the United States